The 2016–17 season was Livingston's first season back in Scottish League One and their first season back in the third-tier of Scottish football, having been relegated from the Scottish Championship at the end of the 2015–16 season. Livingston also competed in the Challenge Cup, League Cup and the Scottish Cup.

Summary

Season

Livingston finished in first place in League One and were promoted as champions back to the Scottish Championship after only one season back in the third=tier of scottish football. On 24 October 2016, Livingston were fined £4,000 by the SPFL after their Scottish Challenge Cup tie with Crusaders, in which they were found to have fielded an ineligible player. Despite progressing to the next round, the SPFL ordered the match to be replayed in full and was held on 1 November.

Results and fixtures

Pre Season

Scottish League One

Scottish League Cup

Group stage
Results

Group G Table

Scottish Challenge Cup

Notes

Scottish Cup

Player statistics

|-
|colspan="12"|Players who left the club during the 2016–17 season
|-

|}

Team Statistics

League table

Division summary

Transfers

Players in

Players out

See also
List of Livingston F.C. seasons

References

Livingston
Livingston F.C. seasons